The 26th Guldbagge Awards ceremony, presented by the Swedish Film Institute, honored the best Swedish films of 1990, and took place on 11 February 1991. Good Evening, Mr. Wallenberg directed by Kjell Grede was presented with the award for Best Film.

Awards
 Best Film: Good Evening, Mr. Wallenberg by Kjell Grede
 Best Director: Kjell Grede for Good Evening, Mr. Wallenberg
 Best Actor: Börje Ahlstedt for The Rabbit Man
 Best Actress: Malin Ek for The Guardian Angel
 Best Screenplay: Kjell Grede for Good Evening, Mr. Wallenberg
 Best Cinematography: Esa Vuorinen for Good Evening, Mr. Wallenberg
 Best Foreign Language Film: Time of the Gypsies by Emir Kusturica
 Creative Achievement:
 Marie-Louise De Geer Bergenstråhle
 Mattias Nohrborg

References

External links
Official website
Guldbaggen on Facebook
Guldbaggen on Twitter
26th Guldbagge Awards at Internet Movie Database

1991 in Sweden
1990 film awards
Guldbagge Awards ceremonies
February 1991 events in Europe
1990s in Stockholm